East Grinstead RFC was a rugby union club based in East Grinstead, West Sussex. The first XV (G-Force) played in National League 3 London & SE for three seasons, until 2015–16, a level five league in the English rugby union system. For season 2016–17 the club has voluntary dropped leagues to Sussex Canterbury Jack Division 2 following the resignation of the main sponsor. In addition to G-Force, East Grinstead run a second XV "Storm", a women's XV, and a range of junior and senior teams.

History
The club was founded in 1929 by Brian Desmond. The current clubhouse at Saint Hill was built in 1997. The club was incorporated as a company in 2009.

In the 2011–12 season, G-Force played in the London 2 South East division (a level 7 division), which they won, gaining promotion to London 1 South. In 2012–13 season they were undefeated and won promotion to the national leagues.

The club made news headlines in September 2020 when its coach, Metropolitan Police officer Matiu Ratana, was shot and killed while on duty in Croydon.

Honours
1st Team:
 Kent 1 v Sussex 1 promotion playoff winners: 2007–08
 London Division 3 South West champions: 2009–10
 London Division 2 East champions: 2011–12
 RFU Intermediate Cup winners: 2012
 London Division 1 South champions: 2012–13
 Sussex 2 champions: 2016–17
 Sussex 1 champions: 2021–22

2nd Team:
 Sussex Asahi Division 4 East champions: 2016–17

3rd Team:
 Sussex Asahi 2 East champions: 2012–13

Sunshine Sevens
Since the 1950s, East Grinstead have hosted an annual Rugby Sevens tournament, which raises money for children's charities.

References

East Grinstead
English rugby union teams
Rugby clubs established in 1929
1929 establishments in England
Rugby union in West Sussex